Baima Tibetan Ethnic Township is an ethnic township for Tibetan people under the administration of Pingwu County in northern Sichuan province, China. The Baima language, a threatened language with approximately 10,000 speakers, is spoken in the ethnic township.

Administrative divisions 
, it has four villages under its administration:
Yiwadaire Village
Eli Village
Gaoshinao Village
Yazhezaozu Village

See also 
 List of township-level divisions of Sichuan

References 

Township-level divisions of Sichuan
Pingwu County
Ethnic townships of the People's Republic of China